Carl Junction is a city in Jasper County, Missouri, United States. The population was 8,143 at the 2020 census.

History
Carl Junction was laid out near a railroad junction by Charles Skinner, who gave the town his German first name of Carl. A post office called Carl Junction has been in operation since 1878.

Carl Junction has a recent history of violent tornadoes. The city was struck by an F3 tornado  on May 4, 2003. On May 22, 2019, the city was hit with an EF3 tornado, causing damage to several buildings.

Geography
Carl Junction is located at  (37.171804, -94.552557).

Carl Junction is approximately eight miles from Joplin.

Demographics

Carl Junction is part of the Joplin, Missouri Metropolitan Statistical Area.

2010 census
As of the census of 2010, there were 7,445 people, 2,616 households, and 2,061 families living in the city. The racial makeup of the city was 93.3% White, 1.0% African American, 1.3% Native American, 1.0% Asian, 0.8% from other races, and 2.6% from two or more races. Hispanic or Latino of any race were 2.9% of the population.

There were 2,616 households, of which 45.5% had children under the age of 18 living with them, 63.3% were married couples living together, 11.4% had a female householder with no husband present, 4.1% had a male householder with no wife present, and 21.2% were non-families. 17.9% of all households were made up of individuals, and 8.6% had someone living alone who was 65 years of age or older. The average household size was 2.84 and the average family size was 3.18.

The median age in the city was 34.7 years. 31.4% of residents were under the age of 18; 6.5% were between the ages of 18 and 24; 27.6% were from 25 to 44; 22.8% were from 45 to 64; and 11.6% were 65 years of age or older. The gender makeup of the city was 48.2% male and 51.8% female.

2000 census
As of the census of 2000, there were 5,294 people, 1,871 households, and 1,534 families living in the city. The population density was 1,084.6 people per square mile (418.9/km). There were 2,006 housing units at an average density of 411.0 per square mile (158.7/km). The racial makeup of the city was 96.11% White, 0.43% African American, 1.27% Native American, 0.36% Asian, 0.1% Dutch, 0.2% Other from other races, and 1.49% from two or more races. Hispanic or Latino of any race were 1.51% of the population.

There were 1,871 households, out of which 45.5% had individuals under the age of 18, 70.0% were married couples living together, 9.0% had a female householder with no husband present, and 18.0% were non-families. 15.6% of all households were made up of individuals, and 6.5% had someone living alone who was 65 years of age or older. The average household size was 2.81 and the average family size was 3.12.

In the city the population was spread out, with 30.0% under the age of 18, 7.2% from 18 to 24, 30.8% from 25 to 44, 22.8% from 45 to 64, and 9.3% who were 65 years of age or older. The median age was 34 years. For every 100 females, there were 95.3 males. For every 100 females age 18 and over, there were 91.6 males.

The median income for a household in the city was $42,575, and the median income for a family was $47,723. Males had a median income of $32,583 versus $23,176 for females. The per capita income for the city was $18,291. About 3.2% of families and 5.1% of the population were below the poverty line, of those individuals below the poverty line, 41.8% were under 18 years of age and 10.4% were over 65 years of age.

References

External links
 https://web.archive.org/web/20140815134909/http://factfinder2.census.gov/faces/tableservices/jsf/pages/productview.xhtml?src=bkmk
 Carl Junction R-1 School District
 Carl Junction Home Page

 https://web.archive.org/web/20131013222920/http://2010.census.gov/2010census/popmap/
 https://www.census.gov/

Cities in Jasper County, Missouri
Joplin, Missouri, metropolitan area
Cities in Missouri